The 1996 New Hampshire Wildcats football team was an American football team that represented the University of New Hampshire as a member of the New England Division of the Yankee Conference during the 1996 NCAA Division I-AA football season. In its 25th year under head coach Bill Bowes, the team compiled an 8–3 record (6–2 against conference opponents) and finished in first place in the New England Division.

Schedule

Roster

References

New Hampshire
New Hampshire Wildcats football seasons
New Hampshire Wildcats football